WINQ-FM (98.7 FM, "WINK Country 98.7") is a radio station licensed to serve Winchester, New Hampshire. The station is owned by Saga Communications (though its Monadnock Radio Group) and licensed to Saga Communications of New England, LLC. It airs a country music format.

The station first signed on as WKBK-FM offering the same programming as WKBK (1220 AM, now WZBK) until its sale. It then became oldies WXOD on October 1, 1991.

The station changed its call sign to WINQ on January 1, 2005. It changed its call sign to the current WINQ-FM on June 19, 2018.

Translators
W270AH, the former WZID translator in Peterborough, is now W276CB 103.1 Keene, which, after having relayed WKNE-HD3 for a while, has been relaying WINQ-HD2, since December 2018.

References

External links
 WINQ-FM official website
 
 
 
 Monadnock Broadcasting Group

INQ-FM
Country radio stations in the United States
Radio stations established in 1992
Cheshire County, New Hampshire
1992 establishments in New Hampshire